Tore Viken Holvik (born 21 October 1988) is a Norwegian snowboarder from Geilo.

His greatest achievement is a third place in a February 2008 halfpipe event during the 2007-08 Snowboarding World Cup circuit. He has placed seven times among the top ten so far, in halfpipe and big air.

References
FIS bio

1988 births
Living people
Norwegian male snowboarders
People from Buskerud
Olympic snowboarders of Norway
Snowboarders at the 2010 Winter Olympics
Sportspeople from Viken (county)
21st-century Norwegian people